Jaksice may refer to the following places:
Jaksice, Kuyavian-Pomeranian Voivodeship (north-central Poland)
Jaksice, Miechów County in Lesser Poland Voivodeship (south Poland)
Jaksice, Proszowice County in Lesser Poland Voivodeship (south Poland)